Al Ahali, also known as Al Ahaly, (Arabic: The Masses) is an Arabic daily newspaper published in Cairo, Egypt. The paper has been in circulation since 1978 and is the official media outlet of the National Progressive Unionist Party

History and profile
Al Ahali was first published in February 1978. It is the organ of the National Progressive Unionist Party which is also the publisher of the daily. The founder of both the paper and the party was Khalid Mohieddin. Dilip Hiro who is an expert on Middle Eastern, Islamic, and central Asian affairs argues that Al Ahali is much more popular than the National Progressive Unionist Party. In 1989 Al Ahali sold nearly 100,000 copies.

Political stance and bans
Al Ahali has a leftist stance and was the major critic of the Sadat rule. Immediately after its start the paper was temporarily shut down by the Egyptian government. In addition, it came across numerous bans, and its offices were attacked by the Egyptian forces during the Sadat rule. Its critical approach continued during the rule of Hosni Mubarak, Sadat's successor.

Content and contributors
Al Ahali was critical of Iranian ruler Shah Mohammad Reza Pahlavi. The paper is the sole Egyptian publication which correctly interpreted the mass demonstrations in Iran in 1978 predicting that these demonstrations were the forerunner of the revolution. In addition, it is the first Egyptian newspaper which published an interview with Ayatollah Khomenei before the revolution in 1979. The daily was among twelve newspapers protested the Islamist-drawn constitution in December 2012. 

Rifaat El Saeed, chairman of the National Progressive Unionist Party, published many articles in the paper which mostly included criticisms over the violation of the rights of the Copts in Egypt. Mahmud Al Muraghi is one of the former editors-in-chief of the daily who resigned from the office on 25 October 1989. Farida Nakash also served in the post.

References

External links

1978 establishments in Egypt
Arabic-language newspapers
Censorship in Egypt
Daily newspapers published in Egypt
Newspapers established in 1978
Newspapers published in Cairo
Liberalism in Egypt